Kryptos koehleri is a species of sea snail, a marine gastropod mollusk in the family Colidae, the true whelks and the like.

Description
The length of the shell varies between 10 mm and 20 mm.

Distribution
This species occurs in the North Atlantic Ocean (Bay of Biscay, Morocco, Azores)

References

 Bouchet P. & Warén A. (1985). Revision of the Northeast Atlantic bathyal and abyssal Neogastropoda excluding Turridae (Mollusca, Gastropoda). Bollettino Malacologico Suppl. 1: 121–296
 Sysoev A.V. (2014). Deep-sea fauna of European seas: An annotated species check-list of benthic invertebrates living deeper than 2000 m in the seas bordering Europe. Gastropoda. Invertebrate Zoology. Vol.11. No.1: 134–155

External links
 Locard A. (1896) Mollusques testacés et brachiopodes, pp. 129-242, pl. 5-6, in: Koehler R. (1896) Résultats scientifiques de le campagne du "Caudan" dans le Golfe de Gascogne. Annales de l'Université de Lyon, 26.
 Dautzenberg, P. & Fischer, H. (1896). Dragages effectués par l'Hirondelle et par la Princesse Alice 1888-1895. 1. Mollusques Gastéropodes. Mémoires de la Société Zoologique de France. 9: 395-498, pl. 15-22
  Serge GOFAS, Ángel A. LUQUE, Joan Daniel OLIVER,José TEMPLADO & Alberto SERRA (2021) - The Mollusca of Galicia Bank (NE Atlantic Ocean); European Journal of Taxonomy 785: 1–114
 

Colidae
Gastropods described in 1896